Greta Richioud (born 11 October 1996) is a French professional racing cyclist, who currently rides for UCI Women's Continental Team .

See also
 List of 2015 UCI Women's Teams and riders

References

External links
 

1996 births
Living people
French female cyclists
People from Tournon-sur-Rhône
Sportspeople from Ardèche
Cyclists from Auvergne-Rhône-Alpes